Southeast Kentucky Community and Technical College (SKCTC) is a public community college in Cumberland, Kentucky.  It is one of 16 two-year, open-admissions colleges of the Kentucky Community and Technical College System (KCTCS).  It was founded in 1960 as the Southeast Center of the University of Kentucky by Senator Richard Glenn Freeman.

SKCTC is accredited by the Southern Association of Colleges and Schools (SACS). Before being renamed in 2004, Southeast Kentucky Community and Technical College was known as only Southeast Community College.

Academics
SKCTC offers three Associate degree programs:
Associate of Arts
Associate of Science
Associate of Applied Science

It also offers diploma and certificate programs.

Service area
The primary service area of SKCTC includes:

 Bell County
 Harlan County
 Letcher County
 Neighboring counties in Tennessee and Virginia

Campuses
SKCTC maintains campuses in Cumberland, Harlan, Middlesboro, Pineville and Whitesburg.

References

External links
 Official website

Kentucky Community and Technical College System
Educational institutions established in 1960
Universities and colleges accredited by the Southern Association of Colleges and Schools
Education in Harlan County, Kentucky
Education in Bell County, Kentucky
Education in Letcher County, Kentucky
Buildings and structures in Harlan County, Kentucky
Buildings and structures in Bell County, Kentucky
Buildings and structures in Letcher County, Kentucky
1960 establishments in Kentucky